Afghan Refugee Camp ( – Ārdūgāh-e Āfghānī) is a village and refugee camp in Taraznahid Rural District, in the Central District of Saveh County, Markazi Province, Iran. At the 2006 census, its population was 3,727, in 649 families.

References 

Populated places in Saveh County
Refugee camps in Iran
Afghan refugee camps